Salvelinus gracillimus is a cold-water species of fish in the family Salmonidae. It was first described by Charles Tate Regan in 1909. 

The species is endemic to Loch of Girlsta in the Shetland Islands; reports of specimens from Loch More on the Scottish mainland are unconfirmed. Introduced fish species and farmed Arctic char constitute potential threats to the populations. The IUCN categorizes the species as vulnerable.

References 

gracillimus
Cold water fish
Endemic fauna of Scotland
Endemic biota of the Scottish islands
Taxa named by Charles Tate Regan
Fish described in 1909